Ponerorchis dolichocentra is a species of flowering plant in the family Orchidaceae, native to south-central China (west Sichuan).

Taxonomy
The species was first described in 1982 as Amitostigma dolichocentrum. A molecular phylogenetic study in 2014 found that species of Amitostigma, Neottianthe and Ponerorchis were mixed together in a single clade, making none of the three genera monophyletic as then circumscribed. Amitostigma and Neottianthe were subsumed into Ponerorchis, with Amitostigma dolichocentrum becoming Ponerorchis dolichocentra.

References

dolichocentra
Orchids of Sichuan
Plants described in 1982